Mossman v. Higginson, 4 U.S. (4 Dall.) 12 (1800), was an 1800 decision of the United States Supreme Court asserting that "The parties to an equity suit must be so described on the record as to show that the court has jurisdiction. It is not enough that an alien is a party; the other party must be a citizen. A writ of error may be amended by filling the blank left for the return day, there being enough on the writ to amend by."

References

External links
 

United States Supreme Court cases
United States Supreme Court cases of the Ellsworth Court
1800 in United States case law